Vidhyarambham is a 1990 Indian Malayalam language film, directed by Jayaraj and produced by G. P. Vijayakumar. The film stars Sreenivasan, Gautami, Nedumudi Venu, KPAC Lalitha and Murali in the lead roles. The film has musical score by Bombay Ravi.

Plot
Madhavan Ezhuthachan is painstakingly exerting like fury to open a school in his native as the children need not walk miles to an afar school. There are several interesting characters in the village. Koppath Bharghavan Nambiar, a patriotic freedom fighter; Natarajan, a horse-cart driver; R. K. Nedungadi, President of a Hindu Temple; Govindan Nair, a running postman; Venkitesan, Ezhuthachan's loyal servant and K. K. Jacob, an aimless hunter. Ezhuthachan lives with and Bhanumathi. He has a son, Prabhakaran who lives distant from the family. After a long haul, Ezhuthachan's school gets the official permission for operation. He and his allies cleanse and renovate the building which was already built for the purpose but attended by Madhavi's tired buffalos. To celebrate the good news, Ezhuthachan and his allies host a small party within themselves. Amidst the jollity, Ezhuthachan dies from a stroke. Following his death, his son files for partition at the court thereby halting the school's operation. At that juncture, P. K. Sudhakaran arrives at the village only to know that the school has halted its operation. He becomes desperate as he had spent a fair sum of money for the teacher's post. He does several things to regain his post or money and becomes the nidus for the story's progression. He gets angry when Prabhakaran assaults him.

Cast

Sreenivasan as P. K. Sudhakaran
Nedumudi Venu as Madhavan Ezhuthachan
Gautami as Bhanumathi (daughter of Madhavan's colleague)
KPAC Lalitha as wife of Madhavan's colleague
Murali as Prabhakaran (Madhavan's son) 
Sankaradi as Koppath Bhargavan Nambiar 
Jagadish as Natarajan 
Mamukkoya as Venkiteshan
Maniyanpilla Raju as Advocate 
Prathapachandran as Advocate 
Alummoodan as R. K. Nedungadi
Bobby Kottarakkara as Raghavan
Oduvil Unnikrishnan as Kumaran Vaidyar
Paravoor Bharathan as Govindan Nair
Philomina as Madhavi 
K. K. Jacob

Soundtrack
The music was composed by Bombay Ravi and the lyrics were written by Kaithapram. The songs were released by Tharangini Records.

References

External links
 

1990 films
1990s Malayalam-language films
Films scored by Ravi
Films with screenplays by Sreenivasan
Films directed by Jayaraj